Weerasekera Diyalatotage Duminda Sanjeewa Perera (born October 29, 1979) in Colombo is a Sri Lankan first-class cricketer. A right-handed batsman and former Sri Lanka under-19 representative, Perera made his first class debut in 1998/99. He has gone on to play for Sri Lanka A. He made his Twenty20 debut on 17 August 2004, for Ragama Cricket Club in the 2004 SLC Twenty20 Tournament.

References

External links
 

1979 births
Living people
Bloomfield Cricket and Athletic Club cricketers
Sri Lankan cricketers